Constitutional Assembly elections were held in Bulgaria on 27 October 1946. The elections served to elect members to the 6th Grand National Assembly, tasked with adopting a new constitution. The Fatherland Front, an anti-fascist coalition dominated by the Bulgarian Communist Party, had come to power in 1944 following a coup. Now that the Second World War was over and the monarchy abolished the communists wanted to adopt a new constitution. The Communists won a large majority, with 53.5 percent of the vote and 278 of the 465 seats. Voter turnout was 92.6%.  This would be the lowest vote share that the Communists or the Fatherland Front would claim during the 43 years of the People's Republic of Bulgaria.  In subsequent years, the Fatherland Front would claim to win elections with unanimous or near-unanimous support.

Results

References

Bulgaria
1946 in Bulgaria
Elections in Bulgaria
1946 elections in Bulgaria
October 1946 events in Europe